Dionisio Botiller or Dionisio de Botiller (1842–1915) was a member of the Los Angeles Common Council, the governing body of the city, in June 1868, December 1868 and in 1869, as well as the city auditor for eight years. He was also the owner of extensive property within the city of Los Angeles, California.

History
The Botiller Californio family had settled in Spanish colonial Las Californias province in the 18th century, living near the pueblo of Santa Barbara. Dionisio was born Oct. 9, 1842 in an adobe structure in the Pueblo de Los Ángeles in Mexican Alta California, near present-day Fourth and Main Streets in Downtown Los Angeles.

He had nine siblings, including brothers Plutarcho Reyes Botiller of Los Angeles, who died in September 1906, Felipe Botiller and Brigido Botiller defendant in Supreme Court case Botiller vs. Dominguez, also of Los Angeles.

Botiller was elected a member of the Los Angeles Common Council, the governing body of the city in June 1868. He was re-elected in December 1868 and in 1869, and resigned on January 20, 1870, after which he became the city auditor for eight years. He was also the owner of much property within the city.

Dionisio died on October 11, 1915, in his residence at 1531 West Ninth Street (now James M. Wood Boulevard) in Los Angeles, California. He was survived by his wife, Francisca de Botiller, and three children, Frank and Celia Botiller and Mrs. Ida Lindley. Services were in Our Lady of Guadalupe Church at Eighth and Valencia streets, with interment at Calvary Cemetery, East Los Angeles.

References
Access to the Los Angeles Times links may require the use of a library card.

Businesspeople from Los Angeles
Los Angeles Common Council (1850–1889) members
19th-century American politicians
1842 births
1915 deaths
People of Mexican California
American people of Mexican descent
Burials at Calvary Cemetery (Los Angeles)
19th-century American businesspeople